In Greek mythology, Kyrbas was a hero whose main achievement was the foundation of Ierapetra in Crete.

Note

Ierapetra
Characters in Greek mythology

References 

 Strabo, The Geography of Strabo. Edition by H.L. Jones. Cambridge, Mass.: Harvard University Press; London: William Heinemann, Ltd. 1924. Online version at the Perseus Digital Library.
 Strabo, Geographica edited by A. Meineke. Leipzig: Teubner. 1877. Greek text available at the Perseus Digital Library.